Ellis Nathaniel Jones (March 16, 1921 – February 24, 2002) was an American professional football player who appeared in eight games for the Boston Yanks of the National Football League in 1945. He only had one arm.

References

1921 births
2002 deaths
Boston Yanks players
Players of American football from Texas
Sportspeople from Abilene, Texas
Tulsa Golden Hurricane football players